Samer Saadi (died 29 September 2005) was a leading figure in the Al-Aqsa Martyrs' Brigades in Jenin.

He was killed during an Israeli incursion into Jenin in the West Bank, along with two other Palestinian militants.  (There are different reports of the names of the two others, but most accounts describe them as his cousin, also called Samer Saadi, and Nidal Ahluf.)

Later the same day, Zakaria Zubeidi, leader of the Al-Aqsa Brigades in Jenin, announced that his group's six-month ceasefire was now at an end.

External links
Al-jazeera report with his photo
BBC report with photo of funeral

Year of birth missing
Palestinian militants
2005 deaths
People from Jenin
Fatah military commanders